Novosphingobium chloroacetimidivorans  is a Gram-negative, chloroacetamide-degrading and non-spore-forming bacterium from the genus Novosphingobium which has been isolated from activated sludge from a wastewater treatment plant in Kunshan City in China.

References

External links
Type strain of Novosphingobium chloroacetimidivorans at BacDive -  the Bacterial Diversity Metadatabase	

Acidophiles
Bacteria described in 2014
Sphingomonadales